Astra is a unisex given name. People with the name include:

Given name
 Astra Biltauere (born 1944), Latvian volleyball player
 Astra Blair (born 1932), British opera singer
 Astra Clément-Bayard, French manufacturer of dirigibles
 Astra Desmond (1893–1973), British contralto
 Astra Edwards (born 1981), Trinidadian table tennis player
 Astra Goldmane (born 1956), Latvian chess player
 Astra Klovāne (born 1944), Latvian chess player
Astra Rībena (born 1959), Latvian luger
 Astra Sharma (born 1995), Australian tennis player
 Astra Taylor (born 1979), American-Canadian filmmaker
 Astra Zarina (1929–2008), Latvian architect

Surname
Gunārs Astra (1931–1988), Latvian human rights activist 

Latvian feminine given names
Surnames from given names
Surnames of Latvian origin
Unisex given names